Victor Muñoz Martiañez (born 25 July 1990) is a Spanish former professional footballer who played as a midfielder.

Career

Early career
Muñoz spent nine years with Real Madrid's academy, spending time with Real Madrid C. At eighteen years old, Muñoz rejected a three-year contract from the club in order to focus on his education. He spent one season playing for Celta de Vigo, before moving to the US.

Muñoz moved to the United States and spent 2010 playing college soccer at Iona College, before transferring to UCLA in 2011.

Sporting Kansas City
On 16 January 2014 Muñoz was selected in the second round of the 2014 MLS SuperDraft by D.C. United becoming the first Spanish player to ever being drafted from college in the history of the MLS. However, Muñoz's rights were traded to Sporting Kansas City on 1 April 2014.

Muñoz made his professional debut on 18 June 2014 in a US Open Cup fixture against Minnesota United.

Arizona United
Muñoz signed with USL club Arizona United on 3 March 2015. After one season in Arizona, he left the club and went back to Spain.

San Sebastián de los Reyes
On 27 July 2015, Muñoz returned to his home country and joined UD San Sebastián de los Reyes. He contributed with 32 appearances and four goals during the campaign, as his side achieved promotion to Segunda División B.

References

External links 
 

1990 births
Living people
Footballers from Madrid
Spanish footballers
Association football midfielders
Tercera División players
UD San Sebastián de los Reyes players
Iona Gaels men's soccer players
UCLA Bruins men's soccer players
USL League Two players
USL Championship players
D.C. United draft picks
OC Pateadores Blues players
Sporting Kansas City players
Phoenix Rising FC players
Spanish expatriate footballers
Expatriate soccer players in the United States